The Ophiostomataceae are a family of fungi in the Ascomycota, class Sordariomycetes. The family was circumscribed by J.A. Nannfeldt in 1932. Species in the family have a widespread distribution, and are typically found in temperate regions, as pathogens of both coniferous and deciduous trees.

Genera
Ceratocystiopsis
Dryadomyces
Equicapillimyces
Graphilbum
Graphiocladiella
Grosmannia
Hyalorhinocladiella
Klasterskya
Knoxdaviesia
Leptographium
Ophiostoma
Pachnodium
Pesotum
Raffaelea
Sporothrix
Spumatoria
Subbaromyces

References

External links

Ophiostomatales
Ascomycota families
Taxa named by John Axel Nannfeldt
Taxa described in 1932